Makutano may refer to:

 Makutano, West Pokot, Kenya, a town in West Pokot County, Kenya
 Makutano, Kirinyaga, Kenya, a town in Kirinyaga County, Kenya

See also